Konareh-ye Rostam (also Romanized as Konāreh-ye Rostam; also known as Kenāreh and Konāreh) is a village in Poshtkuh-e Rostam Rural District, Sorna District, Rostam County, Fars Province, Iran. At the 2006 census, its population was 347, in 76 families.

References 

Populated places in Rostam County